Kasra Naji is an Iranian journalist. He worked as a journalist in Tehran for a number of years during the rise of Mahmoud Ahmadinejad until he was repeatedly denied a press card. Naji is a special correspondent for the BBC and has reported for The Economist, The Guardian, and the Los Angeles Times. He is also the author of 2008 book Ahmadinejad: The Secret History of Iran’s Radical Leader, which was published by the University of California Press.

References

External links
 

Living people
Iranian journalists
Year of birth missing (living people)